Isidore was a 15th-century Greek Orthodox monk, who allegedly produced the first genuine recipe of Russian vodka while being detained in Chudov Monastery in Moscow circa 1430, according to the hypothesis proposed by the Russian historian William Pokhlyobkin. Pokhlyobkin claimed that vodka had been recognized as a uniquely Russian alcoholic drink by the international arbitration in 1982 in a lawsuit brought by Poland claiming exclusive right to use the term "vodka" or "wodka". However, Mark Lawrence Schrad in Vodka Politics: Alcohol, Autocracy, and the Secret History of the Russian State, notes there is no evidence in the archives of the Permanent Court of Arbitration in The Hague of any such legal action by Poland.

A type of distilled liquor close to one that would later become generally designated by the Russian word vodka came to Russia in the late 14th century. In 1386 the Genoese ambassadors brought the first aqua vitae ("the living water") to Moscow and presented it to Grand Duke Dmitry Donskoy, who previously had defeated Tatar-Mongols and their Genoese mercenaries in the remarkable large-scale Battle of Kulikovo in 1380. The Genoese likely got this beverage with the help of the alchemists of Provence, who used the Arab-invented distillation apparatus to convert grape must into alcohol. Since Islam prohibited the drinking of any alcoholic beverages for Arabs, they used alcohol mainly for the production of perfumes. In Christian Europe, however, the aqua vitae became the predecessor of all modern strong alcoholic beverages, including brandy, whisky, schnapps and Russian vodka. The liquid that was obtained as a result of distillation of grape must was thought to be a concentrate and a "spirit" of wine (spiritus vini in Latin), from where came the name of this substance in many European languages (like English spirit, or Russian spirt).

According to the Pokhlyobkin's hypothesis, around 1430 a Thessalian Greek monk called Isidore, kept as a prisoner in Chudov Monastery inside the Moscow Kremlin, made a recipe of the first Russian vodka. Having a special knowledge and distillation devices he became an author of the alcoholic beverage of a new, higher quality. This "bread wine" as it was initially known, was produced for a long time exclusively in the Grand Duchy of Moscow and in no other principality of Rus' (this situation persisted until the era of industrial production). That's why this beverage for a long time was associated with Moscow. Vodka is a diminutive of voda, which means "water" in Russian. The first written usage of the word vodka in an official Russian document in its modern meaning is dated by the decree of Empress Elizabeth of June 8, 1751, which regulated the ownership of vodka distilleries.

See also 
 List of Russian inventors

References

Russian monks
Russian inventors
15th-century Russian people
15th-century inventors